Shirala Mallick  is a Pakistani Politician and a Member of Senate of Pakistan.

Political career
In March 2009, she was elected to the Senate of Pakistan on reserved seat for Women as MQM candidate. She is member of Senate committee of Information Technology and Telecommunication, Information, Broadcasting and National Heritage, Housing and Works 
Planning Development and Reform.

See also
 List of Senators of Pakistan
 Abdul Haseeb Khan
 Hafiz Hamdullah

References

Living people
Members of the Senate of Pakistan
Muttahida Qaumi Movement politicians
Year of birth missing (living people)